Yannick Guerra Dorribo (born 16 August 1988) is a Spanish motorcycle racer.

Career statistics

Supersport World Championship

Races by year
(key)

Grand Prix motorcycle racing

By season

Races by year
(key)

References

External links

Living people
1988 births
Spanish motorcycle racers
Moto2 World Championship riders
Supersport World Championship riders